is a Japanese adult visual novel brand name used by WillPlus. They're known for fantasy games such as Princess Waltz, Lovekami and Miagete Goran, Yozora no Hoshi o. They also have a sub-brand called Pulltop Latte.

Notable games 
 Trouble Captor! - 2002
 Natsu Shoujo - 2003
 Onegai O-Hoshi-sama - 2004
 Yunohana - 2005
 Princess Waltz - 2006
 Haruka ni Aogi, Uruwashi no - 2006
 Te to Te Try on! - 2008
 Shirokuma Bell Stars♪ - 2009
 Lovekami - 2010
 Shinsei ni Shite Okasubekarazu - 2011
 Kono Oozora ni, Tsubasa wo Hirogete - 2012
 Kanojo to Ore to Koibito to. - 2012
 Kono Oozora ni, Tsubasa wo Hirogete FLIGHT DIARY - 2013
 Kokoro@Fankushon! - 2013
 Koisuru Natsu no Rasutorizōto - 2014
 Koisuru natsu no Rasutorizōto Sweetest Summer - 2014
 Kono Oozora ni, Tsubasa wo Hirogete SNOW PRESENTS - 2014
 Kokoro@Fankushon! NEO (Network Enhanted Operation) - 2014
 Mirai Kanojo - 2015
 Natsu-iro Reshipi - 2015
 Miagete Goran, Yozora no Hoshi o - 2015
 Miagete Goran, Yozora no Hoshi o FINE DAYS - 2016
 Yakimochi Kanojo no Ichizu na Koi - 2016
 LoveKami -Sweet Stars- - 2017
 Office de Sasou Ecchi na Kanojo - 2017
 Pure Song Garden! - 2017
 LoveKami -Trouble Goddess- - 2017
 Sora to Umi ga, Fureau Kanata -2018
 Miagete Goran, Yozora no Hoshi o: Interstellar Focus - 2018
 Sakura Iro, Mau Koro ni - 2019
 LoveKami -Healing Harem- - TBA

External links 
Official site

Video game companies established in 2002
Japanese companies established in 2002
Video game publishing brands
Video game companies of Japan
Eroge